The Gaia Foundation is a registered charitable organization in the United Kingdom that promotes ecologically sustainable development. It is involved in a variety of research, educational, political and community activities; these address concerns such as reducing carbon footprints, sustainable use of natural resources, social and economic issues affecting the environment, and environmental impacts of human waste.

References

Conservation and environmental foundations
Charities based in the United Kingdom